Ioan Mackenzie James FRS (born 23 May 1928) is a British mathematician working in the field of topology, particularly in homotopy theory.

Biography 
James was born in Croydon, Surrey, England, and was educated at St Paul's School, London and Queen's College, Oxford. In 1953 he earned a D. Phil. from the University of Oxford for his thesis entitled Some problems in algebraic topology, written under the direction of J. H. C. Whitehead.

In 1957 he was appointed reader in pure mathematics, a post which he held until 1969. From 1959 until 1969 he was a senior research fellow at St John's College. He held the Savilian Chair of Geometry at the University of Oxford from 1970 to 1995. He is now a professor emeritus.

He was elected a Fellow of the Royal Society in 1968. In 1978 the London Mathematical Society awarded him the Senior Whitehead Prize, which was established in honour of his doctoral supervisor, Whitehead. In 1984 he became President of the London Mathematical Society.

He married Rosemary Stewart, a writer and researcher in business management and healthcare management, in 1961. She died in 2015, aged 90.

Books
, Topologies and Uniformities (Springer Undergraduate Mathematics Series), Springer, 1999.
, Remarkable Mathematicians, From Euler to von Neumann, Cambridge University Press, 2002.
, Remarkable Physicists: From Galileo to Yukawa, Cambridge University Press, 2004.
,  Asperger's Syndrome And High Achievement: Some Very Remarkable People, Jessica Kingsley Pub, 2005.
, The Mind of the Mathematician, JHU Press, 2007.
, Driven to Innovate: A Century of Jewish Mathematicians and Physicists, Peter Lang Oxford, 2009.
, Remarkable Biologists: From Ray to Hamilton, Cambridge University Press, 2009.
, Remarkable Engineers: From Riquet to Shannon, Cambridge University Press, 2010.

See also 
James embedding
James reduced product

References

External links

1928 births
Living people
English mathematicians
Fellows of New College, Oxford
Fellows of St John's College, Oxford
Fellows of the Royal Society
British historians of mathematics
Historians of science
Savilian Professors of Geometry
Place of birth missing (living people)
Topologists